The Nash & Cibinic Report is a monthly report providing opinion and advice on current United States government contract issues. The first issue appeared in January 1987. The report is published monthly by West Publishing Company. It was founded and written by John Cibinic Jr. and Ralph Nash.

Notes

Political magazines published in the United States
Monthly magazines published in the United States
Government procurement in the United States
Magazines established in 1987
Reports of the United States government
Legal magazines